The Bahia Honda Rail Bridge is a derelict railroad bridge in the lower Florida Keys connecting Bahia Honda Key with Spanish Harbor Key. It was originally part of the Overseas Railway, but the state of Florida purchased it from the Florida East Coast Railway (FEC) after the 1935 Labor Day Hurricane and converted it for automobile use as part of the Overseas Highway in 1938. After a replacement Bahia Honda Bridge was opened in 1972, two spans of the old bridge were removed for the safety of boat traffic and to prevent pedestrian access to unsafe parts of the bridge.

History

The Bahia Honda railroad bridge was originally built by Henry Flagler as part of the FEC's Overseas Railroad. Opened in 1912, Flagler funded the railway construction between Miami and Key West using his own personal funds. The Labor Day Hurricane of 1935 destroyed much of the line, and FEC sought abandonment. It was purchased by the state of Florida and converted for highway use in 1938. Rather than rebuilding the bridge, the top of the structure was redecked for use as the Overseas Highway (the existing deck inside the truss was too narrow for vehicular traffic).

A new four-lane bridge was built and opened in 1972, a few hundred yards north of the old bridge, replacing the former route of U.S. 1. Two of the truss spans have been removed. One near the east end to allow boat traffic to pass through Bahia Honda Channel without the danger of falling debris from the old bridge; the other at the westernmost end to prevent pedestrians from accessing unsafe parts of the bridge. The original bridge has fallen into a state of disrepair; signs have been posted on the bridge warning boat traffic to watch for falling debris, but all of the sections have remained standing (not counting the two that were removed). The easternmost section remains open to pedestrian traffic and is maintained by Bahia Honda State Park. The bridge provides a scenic overview of the area for tourists.

Structural design
Before being reused as a highway bridge, the Bahia Honda Rail Bridge carried a single track of FEC across Big Spanish Channel from Bahia Honda Key to Spanish Harbor Key. Unlike other bridges on the Overseas Railway, the Bahia Honda has a steel truss construction. This is surrounded by 13 Pratt truss sections spanning  on either side, and 13 smaller Pratt trusses each spanning  outside those. The smaller Pratt trusses have riveted connections, but the larger Pratt and Parker trusses use pinned connections, making the Bahia Honda Rail Bridge the longest pin-connected truss bridge in the U.S.

The original construction of the bridge was carried out by William Krome and Joseph Meredith, and the vehicular conversion was undertaken by B.M. Duncan.

Gallery

See also
 
 
 
 Overseas Railroad
 Overseas Highway
 Bahia Honda Key
 History of the Florida East Coast Railway

References

Bridges in Monroe County, Florida
Former railway bridges in the United States
Railroad bridges in Florida
Florida East Coast Railway
Steel bridges in the United States
Bridges completed in 1912
1912 establishments in Florida
Landmarks in Florida
Road bridges in Florida
Former road bridges in the United States
U.S. Route 1
1972 disestablishments in Florida
Plate girder bridges in the United States
Pratt truss bridges in the United States
Florida Keys